Novo Aeon (Portuguese: New Aeon) is the third solo studio album by the Brazilian musician Raul Seixas. Released in 1975, most of the album was heavily influenced by the work of Aleister Crowley and other occultists, with the major example being the title track. Not as successful as Seixas' previous album, Gita, it was a sales failure. However, it contains some of his most famous songs, such as "Tente Outra Vez", "Rock do Diabo" and "A Maçã".

In 2007, the Brazilian version of the magazine Rolling Stone chose Novo Aeon as the 53rd most revolutionary Brazilian album of all time.

Track listing

References

1975 albums
Raul Seixas albums